SV Drochtersen/Assel is a German association football club from the municipality of Drochtersen, Lower Saxony. The club's greatest success has been promotion to the tier four Regionalliga Nord in 2015 after winning the Niedersachsenliga.

History
The club was formed in 1977 in a merger of the football departments of two local clubs, VTV Assel and TVG Drochtersen. First, unsuccessful attempts to combine the two had already been made three years earlier but were voted down by the members of VTV. It took until 1985 to see the new club having some success when it won promotion to the Bezirksliga. From there the club rose to the Bezirksoberliga Lüneburg, now the Landesliga, in 1987. After an era of success the club declined again in the late 1990s, suffering relegation down to the Bezirksliga in 1997. In 2001 the club returned to what was now the Landesliga Lüneburg.

A runners-up finish in the Landesliga in 2004–05 took SV Drochtersen/Assel up to the tier five Verbandsliga Niedersachsen-Ost where it played as a lower table side for the next three seasons. In 2008, with the disbanding of the Oberliga Nord, the league was renamed to Oberliga Niedersachsen-Ost. Drochtersen/Assel achieved two upper table finishes in the league in the next two seasons. A seventh place in 2009–10 qualified the club for the now single division Oberliga but a 17th place in 2010–11 meant it had to drop down to the Landesliga again.

Winning a championship in the Landesliga Lüneburg in 2011–12 took the club back up to the Niedersachsenliga. After three seasons at this level the club won the league in 2014–15 and earned promotion to the Regionalliga Nord.

After winning the Lower Saxony Cup in 2018, SV Drochtersen/Assel qualified for the DFB-Pokal. In the first round, they were drawn at home against Bayern Munich – winner of the previous six Bundesliga titles – and lost by a sole goal from Robert Lewandowski in the last ten minutes.

In 2019, they won the Lower Saxony Cup again, qualifying for their third participation in the DFB-Pokal in four years. They were beaten 5–0 by Schalke in the first round.

Current squad

Honours
The club's honours:
 Niedersachsenliga (V)
 Champions: 2015
 Landesliga Lüneburg (VI)
 Champions: 2012
 Runners-up: 2005
 Lower Saxony Cup
 Winners: 2016, 2018, 2019

Recent seasons
The recent season-by-season performance of the club:

 With the introduction of the Regionalligas in 1994 and the 3. Liga in 2008 as the new third tier, below the 2. Bundesliga, all leagues below dropped one tier. With the disbanding of the Oberliga Nord in 2008 the two Verbandsligas Ost and West in Niedersachsen were elevated to Oberliga status. From 2010 onwards the Oberliga Niedersachsen, commonly referred to as Niedersachsenliga, has been played in single division format.

Key

References

External links
Official team site 
SV Drochtersen/Assel at Weltfussball.de 

Football clubs in Germany
Football clubs in Lower Saxony
Association football clubs established in 1977
1977 establishments in West Germany